In the run up to the Greek legislative election of September 2015, various organisations carry out opinion polling to gauge voting intention in Greece. Results of such polls are displayed in this article.

The date range for these opinion polls are from the previous general election, held on 25 January 2015, to the day the next election was held, on 20 September 2015.

Election polling

Vote
Graphical summary

Poll results
The tables below list nationwide voting intention estimates. Refusals are generally excluded from the party vote percentages, while question wording and the treatment of "don't know" responses and those not intending to vote may vary between polling organisations. Polls that show their results without disregarding those respondents who were undecided or said they would abstain from voting (either physically or by voting blank) have been re-calculated by disregarding these numbers from the totals offered through a simple rule of three, in order to obtain results comparable to other polls and the official election results. When available, seat projections are displayed below the percentages in a smaller font. 151 seats were required for an absolute majority in the Hellenic Parliament.

References

2015 Greek legislative election
Opinion polling in Greece
Greece